George Edmond Morton (1943-2009) was an English footballer who played as an inside forward for Rochdale. He began his career as an apprentice with Everton before moving to Rochdale in 1962.

References

1943 births
2009 deaths
English footballers
Association football forwards
English Football League players
Rochdale A.F.C. players